Tomasz Hamerlak is a Paralympic athlete from Poland competing mainly in category T54 distance events.

Tomasz has competed in three Paralympics, always competing in a variety of middle and long-distance events. His only Paralympic medal success came in 2004 with a bronze medal in the T54 marathon.

References

Paralympic athletes of Poland
Athletes (track and field) at the 2004 Summer Paralympics
Paralympic bronze medalists for Poland
Living people
Place of birth missing (living people)
Athletes (track and field) at the 2012 Summer Paralympics
Medalists at the 2004 Summer Paralympics
Year of birth missing (living people)
Medalists at the World Para Athletics European Championships
Paralympic medalists in athletics (track and field)
Polish wheelchair racers